Themison may refer to:

 Themison of Eretria, 4th-century BC tyrant of Eretria
 Themison of Laodicea, 1st-century BC Greek physician
 Themison of Samos, 4th-century BC admiral
 Themison of Thera, merchant
 Themison of Cyprus, king of Keryneia